Harris & Frank was a clothing retailer and major chain in the history of retail in Southern California, which at its peak had around 40 stores across Southern California and in neighboring states and regions. Its history dates back to a clothing store founded by Leopold Harris in Los Angeles in 1856 near the city's central plaza, only eight years after the city had passed from Mexican to American control. Herman W. Frank joined Harris in partnership 32 years later in 1888.

Leopold Harris
Harris was born in 1836, Löbau, then in the Province of Prussia, Kingdom of Prussia, now Lubawa, Poland, brother of Morris Herschkowitz. The town was also the birthplace of prominent Los Angeles businessman Harris Newmark and of the Jacoby Brothers, who also founded a major Los Angeles department store. Harris' original name was Lewin Herschkowitz. He arrived in the United States, in 1852 or 1853, spent time in Kentucky, then traveled via Nicaragua together with fellow Löbauer Harris Newmark, to California, arriving in October 1853. Leopold Harris decided to enter business in the new Mormon colony of San Bernardino, California. After several months there and some time outside the U.S., he returned to Los Angeles and founded the London Clothing Company.

He became a U.S. citizen two years later. In 1868 he married Minna Jastrowitz, sister of his business partner Benno Jastrowitz. He died in 1910 on Long Island, New York on his way back to Los Angeles after falling ill on a trip to Europe.

Historic photos

History
Harris's first store, then called The London Clothing Co., was on the Los Angeles Plaza. Harris, alone and with partners, operated a succession of locations, each time further southwest from the Plaza, as the main shopping district moved in tandem.

By 1870, Harris joined Isaac, Nathan, Charles, Abraham, and Lessor Jacoby to buy out Herman W. Hellman's store, to form Harris & Jacoby, which was not only a forerunner of Harris & Frank but of Jacoby Bros., which would grow into a department store that would do business in Los Angeles through the 1930s. The Jacoby brothers, also came from Löbau.

From 1876 to 1882 the store operated as the Quincy Hall Clothing House, at 63 Main St., (pre-1890 numbering), in the Downey Block. (at the time, Commercial St. ran eastward from Main St. just north of Temple St.)

In January 1883, Harris entered into partnership with Benno Jastrowitz (born 1852, like Harris in Löbau, West Prussia), brother of his wife Minna Jastrowitz, as L. Harris & Co..

By February 1883, the Quincy House store had closed and the new L. Harris & Co. store was doing business on the south side of Temple Street in a building that stretched the short distance between Spring and New High streets: 129–131 Spring and 5-7-9 New High streets, in the pre-1890 numbering. This is currently the north end of the Los Angeles City Hall block. 

In July 1886, Harris and Jastrowitz re-added the moniker London Clothing Co.

On June 4, 1888, Jastrowitz sold his part of the business partnership to Herman W. Frank (b. 1860, Walla Walla, Washington), who started as a clerk in Harris' store and married Harris' daughter Sarah. Thus, the business came to have the name it would bear for over a century: Harris & Frank.

By  1894, the store was at 119–125 N. Spring at the southwest corner of Franklin St.

By 1905, the store moved further south to 337–341 S. Spring St., between Third and Fourth streets. For a few months operated concurrently with the Spring and Franklin store.

In 1907, the store moved just a block south to 447–443 S. Spring St., between Fourth and Fifth streets. 

In 1925, Harris & Frank moved further south and west to 635–639 S. Hill St., one block west of Broadway, which had become the main shopping thoroughfare. The building now houses the Wholesale Jewelry Mart.

In 1947, Harris & Frank merged with Brooks Clothing Co. which was located at 644 S. Broadway. By doing so, Harris & Frank added a second downtown location at the former Brooks store at the Joseph E. Carr Building, 644 S. Broadway. 

In 1950, they closed the Hill Street store which had was only a block west of the Broadway store. 

In 1980, they closed their final downtown location at 644 S. Broadway.

Branches
As of 1950, the chain had 15 department store branches as far north as San Jose, California, and as far south as San Diego. In 1959 H. Daroff and Sons, makers of the Botany 500 line of men's clothing, bought Harris & Frank which at that time had 21 branches. In 1970, Northern California chain Pauson's was merged and Pauson's stores were renamed Harris & Frank, bringing the total number of H&F stores to 40.

Other retail businesses
Harris moved to San Bernardino for eight years, and together with his other nephew Arthur, founded the Harris Company in San Bernardino, California, which would become a large, grand department store and a chain across the Inland Empire. All three nephews had worked for Leopold Harris at his Los Angeles store. Afterwards, Harris moved back to Los Angeles.

His nephews Philip and Herman Harris operated the White House store in Santa Ana, California.

Real estate
Mr. Frank was also a real estate developer of the Allen Block at Temple and Spring streets, in 1887 the Salisbury Block on Spring St., and in 1898 the site of Niles Pease Furniture until 1907 and afterwards the Harris & Frank store, 437–443 S. Spring Street.
In 1887, Herman W. Frank (d. 1941) started working for Harris, and became a partner in the business a year in 1888, when its name was changed to Harris & Frank. Frank became Harris's son-in-law by marrying his daughter Sarah.

Locations
Locations over the decades included:
Downtown Los Angeles
Buena Park Mall
Chula Vista Center, opened 1962
Fox Hills Mall 
Downey, Stonewood Shopping Center
East Los Angeles
Glendale
Hollywood Boulevard at Vine
Huntington Park, Downtown on Pacific Blvd. at Gage
Lakewood Center
Long Beach, 240 Pine
Northridge Fashion Center
Orange Mall
Pasadena:
Downtown (390 E. Colorado Blvd.), razed
Hastings Ranch Shopping Center, Foothill at Rosemead blvds. (opened 1959)
Pomona
Santa Ana, Honer Plaza
San Bernardino, Court and E streets
San Diego
San Jose
Santa Ana
Santa Barbara
Santa Monica
Van Nuys, 6723 Van Nuys Blvd.
West Covina, Eastland Center

Notes

1Photographic evidence in Wilson's book shows Harris & Jacoby in the Old Downey Block which was torn down in c. 1870. Also, advertisements for seeds sold at the Hellman store at No. 2 Downey Block, Los Angeles, cease in January 1870 while an ad for the Harris & Jacoby store at No. 2, Downey Block, started appearing in the same newspaper in December 1870. It is currently difficult to establish the exact date in 1870, that the business changed hands from Hellman to Harris and Jacoby, as online archives for Los Angeles newspapers have a gap between the 1864 (for the Star) and 1873 (when the Herald archives commence).

References

Defunct department stores based in Greater Los Angeles
Retail companies established in 1856
1856 establishments in California
Defunct clothing retailers of the United States